Anna Nicole is an English opera in 2 acts and 16 scenes, with music by Mark-Anthony Turnage to an English libretto by Richard Thomas. Based on the life of American model Anna Nicole Smith, the opera received its première on 17 February 2011 at the Royal Opera House, Covent Garden, London, directed by Richard Jones. A recording of the opera was broadcast on BBC Four and BBC iPlayer on 25 March 2011. The broadcast drew in 67,700 viewers. The opera received its first London revival at Covent Garden in September 2014.

Premiere
The opera received its European continental premiere at Theater Dortmund (Germany) in April 2013 with American soprano Emily Newton in the title role. Anna Nicole received its U.S. premiere on September 17, 2013, in a production by the New York City Opera at the Brooklyn Academy of Music, the last work staged by the City Opera before its closure that year.

Roles

Synopsis

Act 1
 'Scene Zero' – Overture
 Scene 1 – 'America Sings'
 Scene 2 – "No! It's Mu-Hay-Uh."
 Scene 3 – "Hey We're Family"
 Scene 4 – 'Falling in Loath Again'
 Scene 5 – 'Life Implants'
 Scene 6 – 'American Dreaming'
 Scene 7 – 'Marriage in the White Dove Chapel'

Act 2
 Scene 8 – 'Red Carpet Diem'
 Scene 9 – 'Partay!'
 Scene 10 – "Not Dead Yet!"
 Scene 11 – 'Backstage at the Larry King Show'
 Scene 12 – 'The Larry King Show and Tell'
 Scene 13 – "Good Morning Hollywood"
 Scene 14 – 'Birth Worth'
 Scene 15 – 'Daniel Death'
 Scene 16 – 'Clown Messiah'

References

External links
"A Tabloid Star Is Joining the Sisterhood of the Fallen" by Michael White, The New York Times (11 February 2011)
 Brooklyn Academy of Music, BAM 2013 Next Wave Festival, programme note on Anna Nicole
 (February 2011)
 (April 2013)

Operas by Mark-Anthony Turnage
2011 operas
English-language operas
Operas set in the United States
Opera world premieres at the Royal Opera House
Operas
Operas based on real people
Cultural depictions of Anna Nicole Smith
Operas set in the 20th century
Operas set in the 21st century